Icaro (Quechua: ikaro) is a South American indigenous colloquialism for magic song.

Icaro may also refer to:
 CV Ícaro, previous name of Club 15-15, a Spanish women's professional volleyball team
 Icaro (manga), a 1997 Japanese manga series
 Icaro 2000, an Italian aircraft manufacturer, including a list of aircraft
 Icaro Air, a former airline based in Quito, Ecuador
 "Icaro", a song by Chana from the 2008 EP Manos Arriba
 Ícaro Oliveira (born 1984), Brazilian football striker
 Ícaro (footballer, born 1989), Ícaro do Carmo Silva, Brazilian football centre-back
 Ícaro (footballer, born 1993), Ícaro Cosmo da Rocha, Brazilian football defensive midfielder

See also
 Icara (disambiguation)
 Icaros (disambiguation)